The men's 5000 metres at the 2019 World Athletics Championships was held at the Khalifa International Stadium in Doha from 27 to 30 September 2019.

Summary

The semi-final heats were held on Friday, in which all three Ethiopian athletes qualified for the final. All three Norwegian athletes also qualified, after European Champion Jakob Ingebrigtsen successfully appealed a disqualification for stepping past the curb of the track during his heat. In the first heat, Aruba's Jonathan Busby was struggling to finish the distance. Braima Suncar Dabó of Guinea-Bissau, who had already finished the race, returned to help his fellow competitor over the finish line, winning applause from the crowd and a nomination for the International Fair Play Award.

During the final, the Ethiopians employed effective team tactics by taking early control of the race, setting a strong pace, and switching leaders once every two laps. Defending Champion Muktar Edris darted out to the front, with his teammates Selemon Barega and Telahun Haile Bekele following closely. Olympic silver medalist Paul Chelimo and his teammate Hassan Mead of the U.S. stayed close as well, along with Canadian-record holder Mohammed Ahmed, Kenyans Jacob Krop and Nicholas Kimeli, and Bahraini athlete Birhanu Balew. Initially, the Ingebrigtsen brothers stayed towards the rear of the leading group, and even briefly lost contact with the front - presumably to conserve energy until the swift early pace had settled down.

The Ethiopian team aggressively defended their lead throughout the first 4000m of the race and switched leaders once every 800 meters like clockwork. Edris took the lead for the first two laps, running the first lap in a quick 61.5 seconds, and a slower second lap of 65.9 seconds. At 800 meters, his teammate Bekele took over the lead and increased the pace. At 1600m, Barega went to the front and continued pushing the fast pace that his teammates had set. After 2400m, Bekele took the lead again. The pace began to decrease slightly, despite that it was still quick enough for Bekele to bring the pack through 3 kilometers in 7:53.0. This allowed the Ingebrigtsen brothers to catch up to the leading group and start moving up through the pack. Chelimo (and briefly, Filip Ingebrigtsen) led for less than one lap, before Barega recaptured the lead around 3400m. The fast pace was continuing to slightly decrease as Barega led the pack for one more lap. With three laps to go, and as the pace slowed, Ahmed moved to the front and tried make a long run for the finish line.

The final kilometer of the race was extremely hectic. The athletes were positioned far too close to each other, considering how quickly and aggressively they were running. For the next two laps, the athletes consistently bumped into one another, clipped each other's heels, and lost their balance - with some competitors pushing and almost falling over each other. Between 1000 and 600 meters remaining, Ahmed attempted to escape the chaos by injecting a brutal 59.9 second lap. The other athletes, however, were unrelenting and stuck to Ahmed like glue. Ahmed visibly threw his arms up in frustration after the other athletes continued to clip his heels and prevent him from running the inside line despite his vicious sub-60 lap. Heavily affected by the fast pace and physical contact with other athletes, Filip Ingebrigtsen  dropped out with 550m remaining, which left Jakob Ingebrigtsenas the remaining Ingebrigtsen sibling in contention for a medal. As he chased Ahmed on the penultimate straightaway, he clipped Ahmed's heels once more, causing him to almost trip and fall.

On the final lap, Jakob Ingebrigtsen made an early, aggressive move to the front. Chelimo attempted to stay with him. Ahmed, Barega, and Edris were all wise to this error, and did not challenge Ingebrigtsen as aggressively as Chelimo did. Barega and Edris passed Ahmed as they began winding up their pace in preparation for their final attack. As Ingebrigtsen and Chelimo began running out of steam off of the final bend, Barega passed them first, with Edris coming wide on the outside. Edris sprinted past Barega to defend his title, with a final lap of 55 seconds. Ahmed and Bekele passed Ingebrigtsen and Chelimo for the third and fourth place, respectively. Evidently suffering from his early move, Jakob Ingebrigtsen was slowing rapidly, and dove at the finish line for a very close fifth place. He then laid on the track, visibly exhausted.

Records
Before the competition records were as follows:

Qualification standard
The standard to qualify automatically for entry was 13:22.50.

Schedule
The event schedule, in local time (UTC+3), was as follows:

Results

Heats
Qualification: First 5 in each heat (Q) and the next 5 fastest (q) advanced to the final.

Final
The final was started on 30 September at 21:20.

References

5000
5000 metres at the World Athletics Championships